Tom Howe (born 3 June 1995) is an English rugby union player who plays on the wing.

Howe was part of Wasps academy system since joining from his local club Beaconsfield. He has represented all of England age-group levels where he was part England U20.

On 28 February 2017, Howe signed his first professional contract with Premiership rivals Worcester Warriors ahead of the 2017-18 season. On 5 October 2022 all Worcester players had their contacts terminated due to the liquidation of the company to which they were contracted.

References

External links
ESPN Profile

1995 births
Living people
English rugby union players
Rugby union players from Milton Keynes
Wasps RFC players
Jersey Reds players
Coventry R.F.C. players
Worcester Warriors players
Saracens F.C. players
Rugby union wings
People educated at the Royal Grammar School, High Wycombe